Sean T. Frazier is an American college athletics administrator.  He is the athletic director at Northern Illinois University, a position he has held since 2013. He previously served as deputy athletic director and chief of staff at the University of Wisconsin–Madison under athletic director Barry Alvarez and as athletic director at Merrimack College. Frazier is a former football student-athlete and alumnus of the University of Alabama.

References

Year of birth missing (living people)
Living people
Clarkson Golden Knights athletic directors
Maine Black Bears football coaches
Manhattanville Valiants athletic directors
Merrimack Warriors athletic directors
Northern Illinois Huskies athletic directors
University of Wisconsin–Madison staff
African-American college athletic directors in the United States
21st-century African-American people